The Río Grande de Tarija is a river of Argentina and Bolivia. It is a tributary of the Bermejo River. It is also known as the Río Tarija and the Tarija River.

See also
List of rivers of Argentina
List of rivers of Bolivia

References

 Rand McNally, The New International Atlas, 1993.

Rivers of Argentina
Rivers of Tarija Department
Border rivers
Rivers of Salta Province
Tributaries of the Paraguay River